Sparkhouse is a BBC drama, originally shown on BBC One from 1 to 8 September 2002. Written by Sally Wainwright, it is a modern take on Emily Brontë's 1847 novel Wuthering Heights.

Synopsis
Two young lovers battle against the odds to be together. The role of Heathcliff is played by a woman (Sarah Smart).

Cast
Carol Bolton – Sarah Smart
Richard Bolton – Alun Armstrong
Lisa Bolton (older) – Holly Grainger 
Lisa Bolton (young) – April James
Andrew Lawton – Joseph McFadden
John Standring – Richard Armitage
Kate Lawton – Celia Imrie
Paul Lawton – Nicholas Farrell

References

External links 
 
 

2002 British television series debuts
2002 British television series endings
2000s British drama television series
BBC television dramas
Television shows based on British novels
2000s British television miniseries
Television series created by Sally Wainwright
Films based on Wuthering Heights
Television shows set in West Yorkshire
English-language television shows